The 2015 Tour of Croatia was the first edition of the Tour of Croatia cycling stage race. It started on 22 April in Makarska and ended on 26 April in Zagreb, and consisted of five stages. It was part of the 2015 UCI Europe Tour, and was rated as a 2.1 event. The race was won by Maciej Paterski, who also won two stages, the points classification and the mountains classification. The second-placed rider was Primož Roglič, while Paterski's teammate Sylwester Szmyd was third.  also won the team competition.

Race overview

Teams
19 teams were invited to take part in the race. Three were UCI Professional Continental teams, fifteen were UCI Continental teams, while the peloton was completed by an Italian national team.

Stages

Stage 1
22 April 2015 — Makarska to Split,

Stage 2
23 April 2015 — Šibenik to Zadar,

Stage 3
24 April 2015 — Plitvice Lakes National Park to Učka,

Stage 4
25 April 2015 — Pula to Umag,

Stage 5
26 April 2015 — Sveti Martin to Zagreb,

Classification leadership table

References

External links
 

2015
Croatia
Tour